South Carolina gained one representative as a result of the 1790 census, increasing from 5 to 6.

See also 
 United States House of Representatives elections, 1792 and 1793
 List of United States representatives from South Carolina

References 

South Carolina
1793
United States House of Representatives